The 32nd Legislative Assembly of Ontario was in session from March 19, 1981, until March 25, 1985, just prior to the 1985 general election. The majority party was the Ontario Progressive Conservative Party led by Bill Davis.

In 1985, Davis retired as party leader and Frank Miller was chosen as party leader in a leadership convention held in January 1985.

John Melville Turner served as speaker for the assembly.

Notes

References 

Members in Parliament 32

Terms of the Legislative Assembly of Ontario
1981 establishments in Ontario
1985 disestablishments in Ontario